Micropolis can refer to:
 A United States micropolitan area
 Micropolis Corporation, a hard disk manufacturer
 Micropolis (La Cité des Insectes), an insect museum in France
 The original working title for SimCity, a computer game
 Micropolis (video game), a re-release of the SimCity source code under the terms of the GNU General Public License
 Micropolis (Besançon), a sector of the area of Besançon (Doubs, France)